Zabriskie Point is a soundtrack album to the Michelangelo Antonioni film of the same name. It was originally released in March 1970 and features songs recorded by contemporary rock acts of Antonioni's choosing, including Pink Floyd, the Grateful Dead, and the Kaleidoscope.

A 1997 re-release includes four bonus tracks each from Jerry Garcia and Pink Floyd that were used in the film, but not the original soundtrack. Jim Morrison of The Doors wrote the track "L'America" for the film, but was rejected by Antonioni ("L'America" was later released on The Doors'  album L.A. Woman). A Rolling Stones track, "You Got the Silver", is featured in the film but not included on this album.

Pink Floyd
Pink Floyd's contributions to the album were recorded in November and December 1969, after the release of Ummagumma.  "Come in Number 51, Your Time Is Up" is a re-recording of "Careful with That Axe, Eugene," originally released as a b-side in December 1968. "Love Scene (Version 4)" is a Rick Wright solo piano composition.  "Country Song" (also known as "The Red Queen") is a ballad filled with chess metaphors.  "Unknown Song" (also known as "Rain in the Country") is a relaxed instrumental.  "Love Scene (Version 6)" (also known as "Alan's Blues") is a bluesy instrumental. A track entitled "Fingal's Cave" and another called "Oenone" were recorded but did not appear on the finished album.

Pink Floyd also recorded other unreleased material during the same sessions. Most notable is a lengthy composition which at that time was known as "The Violent Sequence" (later released on Dark Side of the Moon Immersion Box Set). This was later reworked, as "Us and Them" from The Dark Side of the Moon.  An additional number of tracks of previously unreleased studio work from these sessions have been released in 2016 on The Early Years 1965–1972 (Volume 4: 1970: Devi/ation).

Critical reception 
Village Voice critic Robert Christgau has said the soundtrack album is "considerably deeper and more coherent" than the film. AllMusic's Steven McDonald later called it "an odd melange of songs" but also "well worth hearing" for the Pink Floyd recordings.

Track listing

References

External links 
 

Jerry Garcia soundtracks
Pink Floyd soundtracks
1970 soundtrack albums
Split albums
MGM Records soundtracks
Drama film soundtracks